The 2021–22 Villanova Wildcats men's basketball team represented Villanova University in the 2021–22 NCAA Division I men's basketball season. Led by head coach Jay Wright in his 21st and final year of coaching, the Wildcats played their home games at the Finneran Pavilion on the school's campus in the Philadelphia suburb of Villanova, Pennsylvania and Wells Fargo Center as members of the Big East Conference. They finished the season 30–8, 16–4 in Big East play to finish in second place. They defeated St. John's, UConn, and Creighton to win the Big East tournament championship. As a result, they received the conference's automatic bid to the NCAA tournament as the No. 2 seed in the South region. They defeated Delaware, Ohio State, Michigan, and Houston to advance to the Final Four. There they lost to eventual national champion Kansas.

On April 20, 2022, head coach Jay Wright announced he was retiring effective immediately. Former Wright assistant and Fordham head coach Kyle Neptune was named the new head coach.

Previous season
In a season limited due to the ongoing COVID-19 pandemic, the Wildcats finished the 2020–21 season 18–7 overall and 11–4 in Big East play to finish first place in the conference. As the No. 1 seed in the Big East tournament, they lost in the quarterfinals 72–71 to eventual conference tournament champions Georgetown. In the NCAA tournament, the Wildcats received the 5 seed in the South Regional. They defeated Winthrop and North Texas to reach the Sweet 16, where they fell to eventual tournament champions Baylor 62–51. Villanova finished #11 in the final Coaches Poll.

Offseason

Departures

2021 recruiting class

Coaching changes
Following the 2020–21 season, longtime assistant coach Kyle Neptune left the Wildcats to become the head coach at Fordham. Wright subsequently promoted George Halcovage to Associate Head Coach and Dwayne Anderson from Director of Basketball Operations to Assistant Coach. Mike Nardi remained in his Assistant Coach position.

Roster

Schedule and results

|-
!colspan=12 style=| Regular season

|-
!colspan=12 style=| Big East tournament

|-
!colspan=12 style=| NCAA tournament

Source

Rankings

*Coaches did not release a week 1 poll.

Awards and honors

Big East Conference honors

All-Big East Awards
Player of the Year: Collin Gillespie
Scholar-Athlete of the Year: Collin Gillespie

All-Big East First Team
Collin Gillespie

All-Big East Second Team
Justin Moore

National awards
Bob Cousy Award: Collin Gillespie
Third Team All-American: Collin Gillespie (AP, NABC, Sporting News, USBWA)

References 

Villanova Wildcats basketball
Villanova
Villanova
NCAA Division I men's basketball tournament Final Four seasons
2021 in sports in Pennsylvania
2022 in sports in Pennsylvania